Private Collection: 1979–1988 is a 1988 compilation album by Cliff Richard, featuring songs such as the number one single "We Don't Talk Anymore" from 1979, to his latest release at the time, the Christmas number one hit "Mistletoe and Wine". The album reached number one on the UK Albums Chart.

Track listing
 "Some People"
 "Wired for Sound"
 "All I Ask of You" (with Sarah Brightman)
 "Carrie"
 "Remember Me" *
 "True Love Ways"
 "Dreaming"
 "Green Light" *
 "She Means Nothing to Me" (with Phil Everly)
 "Heart User" *
 "A Little in Love"
 "Daddy's Home"
 "We Don't Talk Anymore"
 "Never Say Die (Give a Little Bit More)"
 "The Only Way Out"
 "Suddenly" (with Olivia Newton-John)
 "Slow Rivers" (with Elton John)*
 "Please Don't Fall in Love"
 "Little Town"
 "My Pretty One"
 "Ocean Deep"
 "She's So Beautiful" (with Stevie Wonder; from Dave Clark's "Time": The Album)
 "Two Hearts" *
 "Mistletoe and Wine"

* Excluded from the compact disc release of Private Collection due to CD time constraints.

Charts and certifications

Weekly charts

Year-end charts

Certifications

References

Cliff Richard compilation albums
1988 compilation albums
EMI Records albums
Albums produced by Alan Tarney